Kumbalathu Sanku Pillai (1898-1969) was a social reformer, politician and freedom fighter from Kollam in erstwhile Travancore. He worked for upliftment of lower Caste, spreading modern education and democratization of Travancore. He was the president of Kerala Pradesh Congress Committee from 1949-1951 and one of the leaders of Vimochana Samaram. He was also the founder and first president of Panmana Ashramam made in commemoration of Chattampi Swamikal.

Life 
Sanku Pillai was born at Prakkulam, Kollam in a landlord family named Thottuvayalil Bungalow on 15 February 1898 and after his childhood he moved to Panmana. He undertook various social reform activities like organizing inter-caste-dining and facilitating temple entry for back ward castes at two temples near Panmana even before the Temple Entry Proclamation of 1936. He was a disciple of Chattampi Swamikal and invited the saint to Panmana in his late years of life. After Chattampi Swamikal passed away, by 1938 Pillai established the Panmana Ashramam to propagate teachings of Swamikal.

The relationship with Barrister A.K. Pillai brought Sanku Pillai into politics. He participated in struggles for responsible government in Travancore. In the end of 1940's he was in forefront of protests against Pattom Thanu Pillai by Indian National Congress members. In this period he rose up in ranks to the president of Kerala Pradesh Congress Committee. Sanku Pillai was also part of the Vimochana Samaram.

He was also the founder of Devaswom board College, Sasthamkotta.

Popular art 
The autobiography of Sanku Pillai is  Ente Kazhinjakaala Smaranakal.

See also 

 C. Kesavan

Reference 

1969 deaths
Politicians from Kollam
People from Kollam
People of the Kingdom of Travancore
Indian independence activists from Kerala
Indian National Congress politicians from Kerala
Malayali politicians
1898 births